De La Salle Secondary School, N.T. (DLS,) is a catholic secondary school in Kam Tsin Tsuen, near Kwu Tung in the New Territories of Hong Kong. It was established by the Brothers of the Christian Schools in 1965. It is one of the Lasallian schools in Hong Kong. (N.T. is the acronym of New Territories, a region in Hong Kong.)

From Form 1 through to Form 4 only boys are accepted, but form 5, 6 and 7 are fully coeducational.

Initially English was used as the medium of instruction. The school began to use Cantonese to teach in 1987, and in 1997 it became the sole instructing language in classes.

Brief history and development

De La Salle Secondary School, N. T. was established in 1965 under the zealous leadership of its first Principal, Brother Felix Sheehan.

Among the Lasallian schools in Hong Kong, it has the distinction of being our only school with nature at its doorstep. The school has a grass football field and a large multi-purpose playground with basketball, handball and volleyball courts. There are also 2 covered areas, one where students can play badminton and the other where many extra-curricular activities are held.

With the support of teachers and parents, De La Salle Secondary School, N.T. has adopted Chinese as the medium of instruction.

At De La Salle, Forms 1 to 3 are streamed. Students in Forms 4, 5, 6 and 7 are placed in classes according to their interests in either arts or science. Forms 1 to 4 were all boys but Forms 5 to 7 were co-educational. Starting from 2007, all forms are now co-ed.

The school badge has as its motto Fides et Caritas—Faith and Love—which reminds the school community that their spiritual values should manifest true love in action.

De La Salle Secondary School, N.T., in keeping with good Lasallian tradition, fulfils a real need for quality education in the New Territories.

See also
 Institute of the Brothers of the Christian Schools
 Lasallian universities and colleges
 Education in Hong Kong
 List of schools in Hong Kong

References

External links

De La Salle Secondary School, N.T.
De La Salle Secondary School, N.T.
De La Salle Secondary School, N.T. Parent-Teacher Association
De La Salle Alumni

Brothers of the Christian Schools
De La Salle Christian Brothers
Lasallian Family Hong Kong

Educational institutions established in 1965
Lasallian schools in Hong Kong
Catholic secondary schools in Hong Kong
Secondary schools in Hong Kong
North District, Hong Kong
1965 establishments in Hong Kong